José María Vergara y Vergara (March 19, 1831 – March 9, 1872) was a Colombian diplomat, journalist, politician, and writer. Vergara y Vergara is known for writing the first literary history of Colombia, a detailed chronological compilation of authors, works, and literary movements between 1538 and 1820.

Works 
Vergara y Vergara admired and read assiduously the works of Fernán Caballero, Antonio Trueba, François René de Chateaubriand and Miguel de Cervantes. He published the Historia de la literatura en Nueva Granada (1867), the anthologies Parnaso colombiano and La lira granadina, and the biography Vida y escritos del general Nariño. He also wrote lyric poetry (Versos en borrador, 1869), costumbrismo portraits, emulating Fernán Caballero, (Las tres tazas y otros cuentos, 1863), and novels (Olivas y aceitunas, todas son unas, 1868).

According to his autobiography, he left some unedited manuscripts: the novel Mercedes; Cuadros Políticos o Días Históricos (starting from 1849); an incomplete dictionary of geography; a dictionary of biographies; and two incomplete novels, Un chismoso and Un odio a muerte.

Newspapers Founded and/or Edited by Vergara y Vergara 
La Siesta (Bogotá, 1852), with Rafael Pombo.
La Matricaria: Periódico de La Juventud. Colección de Artículos de Costumbres, Revistas y Literatura (Popayán, 1854)
El Mosaico: Miscelánea de Literatura, Ciencias y Música (Bogotá, 1858), with Ricardo Carrasquilla and José Manuel Marroquín.
El Heraldo: Órgano Del Partido Conservador (Bogotá, 1860).
El Cundinamarqués: Periódico Oficial y Órgano de los Intereses del Estado (Bogotá, 1861).

External links
 

1831 births
1872 deaths
Colombian diplomats
Colombian journalists
Male journalists
Colombian politicians
Colombian male writers
People from Bogotá
19th-century journalists
19th-century male writers